The 1971 Greyhound Derby took place during June with the final being held on 26 June 1971 at White City Stadium.  
The winner was Dolores Rocket and the winning owner received £10,000. Dolores Rocket was bred and reared by his owner Bert White.

Final result 
At White City (over 525 yards):

Distances 
¾, ½, ¾, 2¼, 1½ (lengths)
The distances between the greyhounds are in finishing order and shown in lengths. One length is equal to 0.08 of one second.

Competition Report
With the National Greyhound Racing Club allowing trainers to seed+ their greyhounds wide for the first time it was generally agreed that there would be less crowding in races. Little County and Moordyke Spot had both retired but defending champion John Silver was entered for the competition. Clohast Rebel trained by Geoff De Mulder set a time of 28.28sec in a solo trial, two spots faster than the track record held by Yellow Printer. Laurels champion Sole Aim, Puppy Derby champion Crefogue Flash and Irish entry Postal Vote topped the ante-post lists alongside Clohast Rebel.

The qualifying round was held on a firm track and many greyhounds posted fast times including Postal Vote who recorded the best time of 28.33, a heat that ended with the elimination of John Silver. The fastest first round winner was Brighton’s Hurst Wickham trained by Fred Lugg in a time of 28.56; Sole Aim, Crefogue Flash and Dolores Rocket also claimed heats.

Dolores Rocket and 'Leap and Run' both won second round heats and remained unbeaten whilst Clohast Rebel bounced back to winning ways in the fastest time of 28.39. Postal Vote and Gold Collar champ Down Your Way both failed to make it to the semi-finals. The semi-finals resulted in two 10-1 shot winners, the first was Leap and Run who had now made the final unbeaten. Clohast Rebel and Crefogue Flash failed to progress. The second semi went to Irish hope Ivy Hall Flash; Sole Aim handled by Nora Gleeson for the duration of the event went out.

The final saw Supreme Fun first away from the traps but Leap and Run soon took the lead and maintained an advantage from Supreme Fun and Moordyk Champion. However it was Dolores Rocket who came from last place to first becoming the first bitch to win the Derby since 1949. Dolores Rocket's dam was Come on Dolores owned by Ernie Gaskin Sr.

+Seeding (The process of classifying a greyhound to run in the inside traps or outside traps, known by the terms railer or wide runner.)

Quarter finals

Semi finals

See also
1971 UK & Ireland Greyhound Racing Year

References

Greyhound Derby
English Greyhound Derby
English Greyhound Derby
English Greyhound Derby